Immigrant Food is a fast-casual restaurant located at 1701 Pennsylvania Avenue NW in Washington D.C. It was founded by chef Enrique Limardo, Peter Schechter, and Ezequiel Vázquez-Ger, and opened on November 12, 2019. Located near the White House, the restaurant combines its food offerings with pro-immigrant activism.

Immigrant Food serves fusion cuisine from China, El Salvador, Ethiopia, and other countries. Its menu is prepared by Limardo.

Immigrant Food opened two more D.C. locations in 2021: a food stall at Union Market on May 12, and an "offshoot" location, Immigrant Food+, in the Planet Word museum on October 7.

Advocacy
Immigrant Food partners with five non-governmental organizations — Asian Pacific American Legal Resource Center, Ayuda, Capital Area Immigrants' Rights Coalition, CASA, and CARECEN — that use the restaurant's upstairs space for meetings and events, including English and citizenship classes. Immigrant Food's work has been called "gastro-advocacy," and its educational materials are critical of the Trump administration's immigration policies.

References

External links
 

2019 establishments in Washington, D.C.
Fast casual restaurants
Fusion cuisine
Immigrant rights activism
Restaurants established in 2019
Restaurants in Washington, D.C.